In the 2021–22 season, RC Arbaâ is competing in the Ligue 1 for the 4th season and the Algerian Cup, On July 18, 2021, RC Arbaâ promoted to the Algerian Ligue Professionnelle 1 after five seasons of absence.

Squad list
Players and squad numbers last updated on 20 October 2021.Note: Flags indicate national team as has been defined under FIFA eligibility rules. Players may hold more than one non-FIFA nationality.

Competitions

Overview

{| class="wikitable" style="text-align: center"
|-
!rowspan=2|Competition
!colspan=8|Record
!rowspan=2|Started round
!rowspan=2|Final position / round
!rowspan=2|First match	
!rowspan=2|Last match
|-
!
!
!
!
!
!
!
!
|-
| Ligue 1

|  
| 12th
| 23 October 2021
| 11 June 2022
|-
! Total

Ligue 1

League table

Results summary

Results by round

Matches
The league fixtures were announced on 7 October 2021.

Squad information

Playing statistics

|-
! colspan=10 style=background:#dcdcdc; text-align:center| Goalkeepers

|-
! colspan=10 style=background:#dcdcdc; text-align:center| Defenders

|-
! colspan=10 style=background:#dcdcdc; text-align:center| Midfielders

|-
! colspan=10 style=background:#dcdcdc; text-align:center| Forwards

|-
! colspan=10 style=background:#dcdcdc; text-align:center| Players transferred out during the season

Goalscorers

Includes all competitive matches. The list is sorted alphabetically by surname when total goals are equal.

Transfers

In

Out

References

2021-22
Algerian football clubs 2021–22 season